Atharokhada Union is a union parishad situated at Magura Sadar Upazila,  in Magura District, Khulna Division of Bangladesh. There are 29 villages and 17 mouzas in the union.

Villages
 Akkurpara
 West Barial
 Naldah
 East Barial
 Araishoto
 Chandan Pratap
 Maland
 Gangnalia
 Gopinathpur
 Govindaprir
 Chanpur
 Arkandi
 Krishnabila
 Naliyardangi
 Bashkotha
 Katakhali
 Kalinagar
 Mrigidanga
 Bagdanga
 Shyamnagar
 Golaknagar
 Charpara
 Dhankhali
 Tengakhali
 Vijayanagar
 Jacquardtack
 Madhabpur
 Atharkhada
 Alikhani

References

External links
 

Unions of Khulna Division
Unions of Magura Sadar Upazila
Unions of Magura District